Maindargi (IPA:Maindargī) is a town and a municipal council in Akkalkot taluka of Solapur district in the Indian state of Maharashtra. In Maindargi there is the Shree Shivachaleshwar Temple.

Geography
It has an average elevation of 473 metres (1551 feet).

Demographics
 India census, Maindargi had a population of 47001. Males constitute 51% of the population and females 49%. Maindargi has an average literacy rate of 58%, lower than the national average of 59.5%: male literacy is 70%, and female literacy is 46%. In Maindargi, 15% of the population is under six years of age.

References

Cities and towns in Solapur district